Order of Honor may refer to:
Order of Honour (Armenia)
Order of Honor (Belarus), established in 1995
Order of Honor (Georgia)
Order of Honour (Greece), an award that replaced the abolished Royal Order of George I in 1975
Order of Honour (Moldova)
Order of Honor (Republika Srpska)
Order of Honour (Russia), established in 1994 after the dissolution of the Soviet Union
Order of Kurmet, a decoration of Kazakhstan established in 1993
Order of the Badge of Honour, a Soviet decoration awarded between 1935 and 1988
Order of Honour, a Soviet decoration awarded between 1988 and 1994